Keckler is a surname. Notable people with the surname include:

Heather Keckler (fl. 1980s–2000s), American beauty pageant contestant and dancer
Joseph Keckler, American singer, musician, performing artist, and writer
Luis María Kreckler (born 1954), Argentine diplomat
Stephen W. Keckler, American computer scientist 
W. B. Keckler (born 1966), American poet